The 1909 Maryland Aggies football team represented Maryland Agricultural College (later part of the University of Maryland) in the 1909 college football season. The Aggies compiled a 2–5 record, were shut out by five opponents, and were outscored by all opponents, 101 to 19. Edward Larkin and William Lang were the team's coaches.

Schedule

References

Maryland
Maryland Terrapins football seasons
Maryland Aggies football